Haplogroup G is found at modest percentages amongst Jewish men within multiple subgroups of haplogroup G (Y-DNA), with the majority falling within the G2b and G2c category. Haplogroups that are more commonly found amongst Jews are Haplogroups E and J. Jewish ethnic divisions, ranging from about a third of Moroccan Jews to almost none reported among the Indian, Yemenite and Iranian communities.

Haplogroup G Found within Jewish Communities
The following percentages of haplogroup G persons have been found in the various Jewish communities listed in descending order by percentage of G.

See also
genetic genealogy
Haplogroup G (Y-DNA) Country by Country

References

 Y-DNA Haplogroup G - Jewish Diaspora
Haplogroup